Eleonora "Leonora" Kaminskaitė ( Ruokienė, 29 January 1951 – 9 February 1986) was a Lithuanian rower who was most successful in the double sculls. In this event she won a bronze medal at the 1976 Summer Olympics and a silver at the 1978 World Rowing Championships. She graduated from the Lithuanian Sports University in 1972.

References

1951 births
1986 deaths
People from Prienai District Municipality
Lithuanian female rowers
Soviet female rowers
Olympic rowers of the Soviet Union
Rowers at the 1976 Summer Olympics
Olympic bronze medalists for the Soviet Union
Olympic medalists in rowing
World Rowing Championships medalists for the Soviet Union
Medalists at the 1976 Summer Olympics